The 2019 OFC Futsal Champions League was the first edition of the OFC Futsal Champions League, an international futsal club tournament in Oceania organised by the Oceania Football Confederation (OFC). It was held in Auckland, New Zealand between 5–8 December 2019.

Teams
The champion futsal teams from six OFC member associations entered the competition.

Venue
The matches were played at the Barfoot & Thompson Stadium in Auckland.

Group stage

Times are NZDT (UTC+13).

Final stage

Fifth place match

Third place match

Final

Awards
The following awards were given at the conclusion of the competition:
Fair Play Award: AFF Futsal
Golden Gloves: Joseph Haoata (AS Pirae Futsal)
Golden Boot: Benjamin Mana (Kooline) – 8 goals
Atta Elayyan Award – Young Player of the Tournament: Adam Larce-Paulsen (AFF Futsal)
Golden Boot: Christ Pei (AS PTT)

References

External links
OFC Futsal Champions League 2019
News > OFC Futsal Champions League 2019, oceaniafootball.com

2019 in futsal
2019–20 in OFC football
International futsal competitions hosted by New Zealand
Sports competitions in Auckland
December 2019 sports events in New Zealand
Association football in Auckland